Teatime Dub Encounters is a collaborative EP by British electronic music group Underworld and American singer-songwriter Iggy Pop. It was released on July 27, 2018, by Caroline International, except in Japan where it was released by Beat Records.

Critical reception

At Metacritic, which assigns a normalised rating out of 100 to reviews from mainstream publications, Teatime Dub Encounters received an average score of 65, based on eight reviews, indicating "generally favorable reviews".

Commercial performance
Teatime Dub Encounters debuted at number 20 on the UK Albums Chart, selling 2,782 units in its first week. It also debuted at number two on the Vinyl Albums Chart in the UK, where it sold 789 copies of the vinyl edition.

Track listing

Personnel
Iggy Pop - vocals
Karl Hyde
Rick Smith
with:
Esme Bronwen-Smith - additional vocals

Charts

References

2018 EPs
Underworld (band) albums
Iggy Pop albums
Caroline Records albums